Wall's keelback (Herpetoreas xenura) is a species of natricine snake endemic to Northeast India.

Geographic range
It is found in Khasi Hills in the Indian state of Meghalaya. It is also found in Myanmar.

References

Further reading
 Smith, M.A. 1943. The Fauna of British India, Ceylon and Burma, Including the Whole of the Indo-Chinese Sub-region. Reptilia and Amphibia. Vol. III. — Serpentes. Secretary of State for India. (Taylor and Francis, Printers). London. 583 pp. (Natrix xenura, p. 292.)
 Wall, F. 1907. Some new Asian snakes. J. Bombay Nat. Hist. Soc. 17 (3): 612–618. (Tropidonotus xenura, p. 616.)

Herpetoreas
Snakes of Asia
Reptiles of India
Endemic fauna of India
Reptiles described in 1907
Taxa named by Frank Wall